Coprinopsis marcescibilis is a species of agaric fungus in the family Psathyrellaceae. It was first described in 1893 by German mycologist Max Britzelmayr; Rolf Singer moved it to Psathyrella in 1951. It was transferred to Coprinopsis in 2008, when molecular analysis revealed phylogenetic affinity with that genus. The species is found in Europe and North America.

See also
List of Coprinopsis species

References

External links

marcescibilis
Fungi of Europe
Fungi of North America
Fungi described in 1893